The 2011–12 Premijer Liga season is the twenty-one since its establishment.

Teams

Regular season

Standings

Pld - Played; W - Won; L - Lost; PF - Points for; PA - Points against; Diff - Difference; Pts - Points.

Championship Round

Standings

Pld - Played; W - Won; L - Lost; PF - Points for; PA - Points against; Diff - Difference; Pts - Points.

5th Place Round

Standings

Pld - Played; W - Won; L - Lost; PF - Points for; PA - Points against; Diff - Difference; Pts - Points.

Relegation Round

Standings

Pld - Played; W - Won; L - Lost; PF - Points for; PA - Points against; Diff - Difference; Pts - Points.

2011-12 winning team

RK Croatia Osiguranje Zagreb
GK: Ivan Pešić, Marin Šego,  Matej Asanin, Filip Ivić
LB: Tonči Valčić, Jakov Gojun, Goran Bogunović
CB: Ivano Balić, David Špiler, Ante Kaleb, Josip Valčić
RB: Luka Stepančić, Luka Šebetić
RW: Zlatko Horvat, Jerko Matulić Filip Čelić
LW: Ljubo Vukić, Manuel Štrlek, Lovro Šprem
LP: Michal Kopčo, Marino Marić, Ilija Brozović
Head coach: Slavko Goluža
Source: eurohandball.com

See also
2011–12 SEHA League

External links
Scoresway  

Croatian Premier Handball League seasons
2011–12 domestic handball leagues
2012 in Croatian sport
2013 in Croatian sport